Tiffany Kruger (born July 18, 1987 in Durban) is a South African sprint canoeist. Kruger is a member of Natal Canoe Club in Pietermaritzburg, and is coached and trained by former Olympic silver medalist Attila Adrovicz of Hungary (1992).

Kruger represented South Africa at the 2012 Summer Olympics in London, where she competed in the first ever women's K-1 200 metres. She paddled in the third heat against six other canoeists, including former Olympic champion Inna Osypenko of Ukraine. Kruger, however, failed to advance into the semi-finals, as she finished seventh in her heat by nearly three seconds behind Slovakia's Ivana Kmeťová, with a time of 46.122 seconds.

References

External links
NBC Olympics Profile

1987 births
South African female canoeists
Living people
Olympic canoeists of South Africa
Canoeists at the 2012 Summer Olympics
Sportspeople from Durban
African Games gold medalists for South Africa
African Games medalists in canoeing
Competitors at the 2011 All-Africa Games